Events from the year 1891 in the United States.

Incumbents

Federal Government 
 President: Benjamin Harrison (R-Indiana)
 Vice President: Levi P. Morton (R-New York)
 Chief Justice: Melville Fuller (Illinois)
 Speaker of the House of Representatives: Thomas Brackett Reed (R-Maine) (until March 4), Charles Frederick Crisp (D-Georgia) (starting December 8)
 Congress: 51st (until March 4), 52nd (starting March 4)

Events
 January 20 – Jim Hogg becomes the first native Texan to be governor of that state.
 January 27 – Mammoth Mine disaster
 January 29 – Liliuokalani is proclaimed Queen of Hawaii.
 March 3
 The International Copyright Act of 1891 is passed by the Fifty-first United States Congress.
 Yellowstone Timberland Reserve, predecessor of Shoshone National Forest, in Wyoming is established as the first United States National Forest.
 March 14 – In New Orleans, a lynch mob storms the Old Parish Prison and lynches 11 Italians who had been found not guilty of the murder of Police Chief David Hennessy.
March 30 – Shoshone National Forest is established in Wyoming, the first U.S. National Forest.
 April 1 – The Wrigley Company is founded in Chicago.
 May 5 – The Music Hall in New York (later known as Carnegie Hall) has its grand opening and first public performance, with Tchaikovsky as guest conductor.
 May 20 – Thomas Edison's prototype kinetoscope is first displayed at Edison's Laboratory, for a convention of the National Federation of Women's Clubs.
 June 1 – The Johnstown Inclined Plane opens in Johnstown, Pennsylvania.
 June 21 – First long-distance transmission of alternating current by the Ames power plant near Telluride, Colorado by Lucien and Paul Nunn.
 September 23 – California Institute of Technology in California is founded.
 October 1 – Stanford University in California opens its doors.
October 16 – White River National Forest is established in Colorado.
 November 28 – The International Brotherhood of Electrical Workers is organized in St. Louis, Missouri.
 December 17 – Drexel University is inaugurated as the Drexel Institute of Art, Science and Industry in Philadelphia.

Undated
 Seattle University is established as the Immaculate Conception school.
 Marie Owens becomes (probably) the first female police officer in the U.S., with the Chicago Police Department.
 Jesse W. Reno invents the first working escalator, installed as an attraction at the Old Iron Pier, Coney Island , New York City.

Ongoing
 Gilded Age (1869–c. 1896)
 Gay Nineties (1890–1899)
 Progressive Era (1890s–1920s)
 Garza Revolution in Texas and Mexico (1891–1893)

Births

January–June
 January 1 – Charles Bickford, actor (died 1967)
 January 2 – Charles P. Thompson, actor (died 1979)
 January 7 – Zora Neale Hurston, Harlem Renaissance writer (died 1960)
 January 25 – Wellman Braud, jazz bassist (died 1966)
 January 28 – Bill Doak, baseball player (died 1954)
 February 10 – Elliot Paul, writer (died 1958)
 February 12 – Eugene Millikin, U.S. Senator from Colorado from 1941 to 1957 (died 1958)
 February 13 – Grant Wood, painter (died 1942)
 February 15 – Henry J. Knauf, politician (died 1950)
 March 10 – Sam Jaffe, actor (died 1984)
 March 19 – Earl Warren, Chief Justice of the United States (died 1974)
 March 26 – Will Wright, actor (died 1962)
 April 13 – Nella Larsen, novelist (died 1964)
 April 15 – Wallace Reid, actor (died 1923)
 April 19 – W. Alton Jones, industrialist and philanthropist (died 1962)
 April 26 – Lucy Mercer Rutherfurd, mistress of Franklin D. Roosevelt (died 1948)
 May 21 – John Peale Bishop, writer (died 1944)
 May 22 – Eddie Edwards, jazz trombonist (died 1963)
 May 24 – William F. Albright, archeologist and Biblical scholar (died 1971)
 May 26 – Mamie Smith, African American blues singer (died 1946)
 May 30 – Ben Bernie, bandleader (died 1943)
 June 3 – Jim Tully, vagabond, pugilist and writer (died 1947)
 June 8 – Audrey Munson, actress (died 1996)
 June 9 – Cole Porter, composer and songwriter (died 1964)
 June 28 – Esther Forbes, writer (died 1967)
 June 30 – Man Mountain Dean, wrestler (died 1953)

July–December
 July 5 – John Howard Northrop, biochemist, winner of the Nobel Prize in Chemistry in 1946 (suicide 1987)
 July 16 – Blossom Seeley, singer and vaudeville performer (died 1974)
 July 26 – William J. Connors, politician (died 1961)
 August 1 – Edward Streeter, humorist (died 1976)
 August 29 –  Joyce Hall, founder of Hallmark Cards (died 1982)
 September 3 – Bessie Delany, African American physician and author (died 1995)
 September 28 – Myrtle Gonzalez, silent film actress (died 1918)
 October 7 – Charles R. Chickering, illustrator (died 1970)
 October 25 – Charles Coughlin, antisemitic radio host and Catholic priest (died 1979)
 October 29 – Fanny Brice, actress, comedian and singer (died 1951)
 November 2 – David Townsend, art director (1935)
 November 7 – Miriam Cooper, silent film actress (died 1976)
 November 10 – Carl Stalling, cartoon film composer (died 1972)
 November 15 – Vincent Astor, philanthropist (died 1959)
 December 14 – Katherine MacDonald, silent film actress (died 1956)
 December 26 – Henry Miller, novelist (died 1980)

Deaths
 January 5 – Emma Abbott, operatic soprano (born 1850)
 January 17 – George Bancroft, historian (born 1800)
 January 29 – William Windom, U.S. Senator from Minnesota from 1870 to 1881 and from 1881 to 1883 (born 1827)
 February 14 – William Tecumseh Sherman, Civil War general (born 1820)
 February 21 – James Timberlake, law enforcement officer (born 1846)
 February 28 – George Hearst, U.S. Senator from California from 1887 to 1891 (born 1820)
 March 6  
 George M. Chilcott, U.S. Senator from Colorado from 1882 to 1883 (born 1828)
 Joshua Hill, U.S. Senator from Georgia from 1871 to 1873 (born 1812)
 March 21 – Joseph E. Johnston, Confederate Army general (born 1807)
 April 2 – Albert Pike, Confederate military officer, attorney, writer and Freemason (born 1809)
 April 7 – P. T. Barnum, showman, businessman, and politician (b. 1810)
 April 14 – Annie Nowlin Savery, suffragist (born 1831 in the United Kingdom)
 June 9 – Henry Edwards, entomologist and actor (born 1827 in the United Kingdom)
 June 17 – Harrison Ludington, 13th Governor of Wisconsin from 1876 to 1878 (born 1812)
 June 21 – Joseph E. McDonald, U.S. Senator from Indiana from 1875 to 1881 (born 1819)
 July 4 – Hannibal Hamlin, 15th Vice President of the United States from 1861 to 1865 (born 1809)
 August 5 – Thomas S. Bocock, U.S. Congressman, Speaker of the Confederate States House of Representatives (born 1815)
 August 12 – James Russell Lowell, Romantic poet, critic, satirist, writer, diplomat and abolitionist (born 1819)
 August 14
 John Henry Hopkins Jr., clergyman and hymnist (born 1820)
 Sarah Childress Polk, First Lady of the U.S. (born 1803)
 August 27 – Samuel C. Pomeroy, U.S. Senator from Kansas from 1861 to 1873 (born 1816)
 September 10 – Charles B. Clark, politician and entrepreneur (born 1844)
 September 28 – Herman Melville, novelist, short story writer and poet (born 1819)
 October 16 – Sarah Winnemucca, Northern Paiute author, activist and educator (born 1844)
 November 6 – J. Gregory Smith, Vermont governor (born 1818)
 November 17 – George H. Cooper, admiral (born 1821)
 December 7 – Mary Crane, activist; mother of writer Stephen Crane (born 1827)
 December 12 – Julia A. Ames, reformer (born 1861)
 December 20 – Preston B. Plumb, U.S. Senator from Kansas from 1877 to 1891 (born 1837)
 December 29 – Marion McKinley Bovard, academic administrator, 1st President of the University of Southern California (born 1847)

See also
 List of American films of the 1890s
 Timeline of United States history (1860–1899)

External links
 

 
1890s in the United States
United States
United States
Years of the 19th century in the United States